Visions du Réel (Visions of Reality) is an internationally renowned documentary film festival held in April each year in Nyon, Switzerland.  Established in 1969 as the Nyon International Documentary Film Festival, the event adopted its current name in 1995 and is the largest Swiss documentary festival.

At its inception, the festival promoted Swiss films and films that were otherwise inaccessible — that is, those created in the Eastern Bloc countries behind the Iron Curtain.  Now open to worldwide entries, the week-long festival has been directed by film critic Jean Perret since 1995.

The festival was founded by Moritz de Hadeln (who later headed the Locarno International Film Festival, the Berlin International Film Festival, the Venice International Film Festival and the short-lived New Montreal FilmFest of 2005) and his wife  Erika de Hadeln:

Moritz de Hadeln directed the festival until 1979, and he assisted Erika when she took over as head of the festival from 1980 to 1993.

During the early years of the Nyon International Documentary Film Festival,  Erika de Hadeln negotiated with the film authorities in East Europe and Russia — and worked with documentary filmmakers including Joris Ivens, Roman Karmen, Georges Rouquier, Basil Wright,  and Henri Storck. The event served as a template for film festivals that followed, including those in Amsterdam and Munich.

Each year, the festival invites and pays tribute to a guest of honor who has made significant contributions in the field of documentary and/or fiction films. The honoree is awarded the prestigious Honorary Award (previously the “Prix Maître du Réel”). Past recipients include Claire Denis, Werner Herzog, Claire Simon, Peter Greenaway, Alain Cavalier, Barbet Schroeder, and Richard Dindo.

Visions du Réel is part of the Doc Alliance – a creative partnership between seven European documentary film festivals.

Sections
 International Feature Film Competition 
 Burning Lights International Competition 
 National Competition 
 International Medium Length and Short Film Competition 
 Opening Scenes 
 Grand Angle 
 Latitudes

Awards
 International Feature Film Competition
 Sesterce d’or — Best feature film
 Jury Prize — Most innovative feature film
 Special Mention
 Interreligious Award 
 Burning Lights International Competition
 Sesterce d’or — Best medium length or feature film
 Jury Prize — Most innovative medium length or feature film
 Special Mention
 National Competition
 Sesterce d’or — Best medium length or feature film
 Jury Prize — Most innovative feature film
 Special Mention
 International Medium Length & Short Film Competition
 Sesterce d’or — Best medium length film
 Jury Prize — Most innovative medium length film
 Special Mention
 Sesterce d’argent — Best short film
 Youth Jury Prize — Most innovative short film
 Grand Angle
 Sesterce d’argent Prix du Public — Best feature film

Festival team

Presidents
 1969-1973: Bernard Glasson
 1974-1981: Maurice Ruey
 1982: Denys Gilliéron
 1983-1991: Armand Forel
 1992-1997: Gaston Nicole
 1998-2001: Jérôme Bontron
 2002-2003: Peter Tschopp
 2004-2009: Jean Schmutz
 2009-2019: Claude Ruey
 since 2019: Raymond Loretan

Directors
 1969-1979: Moritz de Hadeln
 1980-1994: Erika de Hadeln
 1994-2010: Jean Perret
 2010-2017: Luciano Barisone
 since 2018: Emilie Bujès

References

External links
 (in French, German and English)

Film festivals established in 1995
Film festivals in Switzerland
Documentary film festivals in Switzerland
Nyon
1969 establishments in Switzerland
Spring (season) events in Switzerland